Taylor Shelden (born March 31, 1987) is an American professional racing cyclist, who last rode for UCI Continental team . He rode in the men's team time trial at the 2015 UCI Road World Championships.

References

External links

1987 births
Living people
American male cyclists
Place of birth missing (living people)